Trešnjevac (Serbian Cyrillic: Трешњевац) is a village in Serbia. It is situated in the Kanjiža municipality, in the North Banat District, Vojvodina province. The village has a Hungarian ethnic majority (96.19%) and its population numbering 1,868 people (2002 census).

History
Human communities have lived in this area as early as in the Stone Age. The first written record about the settlement is from 1271. The record mention it under the name Fel-Adrian. Modern Trešnjevac was founded around the 1850s.

Historical population
1961: 2,357
1971: 2,304
1981: 2,135
1991: 2,028
2002: 1,868
2011: 1,763

Features
The inhabitants of the village are mostly farmers; sheep breeding is one of the characteristic features of Trešnjevac.

Politics
During the Bosnian War, the Zitzer Club (Zitzer Spiritual Republic) was an important gathering place for those, who resisted the ongoing war. The foreign media paid special attention to it.

Cultural life
Gazdag Ág, organized in Trešnjevac, is one of the most important folk events in the municipality. It is a competition between folk organizations. The aim of the event is to give platform to the rich cultural heritage of ethnic Hungarian villages in the region. The German Filmmakers Marc Haenecke and Michael Leuthner shot a feature-length documentary about the Zitzer Club, which was broadcast on German TV and was shown on several film festivals.

See also
List of places in Serbia
List of cities, towns and villages in Vojvodina

References
 Slobodan Ćurčić, Broj stanovnika Vojvodine, Novi Sad, 1996.

External links

 History of Trešnjevac 

Places in Bačka
Populated places in North Banat District
Kanjiža
Hungarian communities in Serbia